Asura hopkinsi is a moth of the family Erebidae. It is found on Samoa.

References

hopkinsi
Moths described in 1935
Moths of Oceania